Vizada is a worldwide satellite communications service provider which operates earth ground stations that connect satellite communications to terrestrial telecommunications and IP networks. Vizada provides both mobile and fixed satellite telecommunications to a wide array of markets including merchant shipping, defense and government, fishing and yachting, oil and gas, mining, and non-governmental organizations. The product offering covers maritime, land, and aeronautical services. In 2011, the Vizada Group was acquired by EADS, to be integrated as a subsidiary of Astrium.

History 
Vizada has a long history which includes the acquisitions and reorganizations of several leading global telecommunications entities including France Telecom and Telenor, as well as vertically-specialized companies such as Sait Communications and TDCom.

1940s: The company was involved in maritime communications from World War II, when it began operating a network of radio communications in Europe.

1970s: Originally part of Norwegian operator Telenor, Vizada became the first to use satellites for domestic use.

1976: Eik Teleport, situated on the southwest coast of Norway, was established to provide communications to oil platforms in the North Sea.

1979: Creation of the International Maritime Satellite Organisation (Inmarsat) under the auspices of United Nations and IMO with the contribution of France, Norway, and the US as founding members.

1991: The France Telecom group was the fifth largest shareholder in Inmarsat, the international maritime satellite provider. Telenor Satellite Services at Eik Teleport developed the Sealink Maritime VSAT solution to provide communications services between remote locations at sea and fleet management offices on shore.

1997: Creation of Taide Network (now Vizada Networks) in Holmestrand, Norway, from an academic project initiated at universities in Oslo, Norway, and Vilnius, Lithuania in the early 1990s. VSAT services operations were established in the Netherlands, the Czech Republic, Slovakia, Poland, and Austria.

1999: Satellite services were split from Telenor core business into independent operating units: Telenor Satellite Services (maritime Inmarsat and fixed satellite services) and Telenor Satellite Network (VSAT networks). They would later form one single company.

2001–2002: France Telecom Mobile Satellite Communications acquired DT Mobile Satellite (Germany), Glocall (Netherlands), and TDcom (France).

2002: Telenor Satellite Services acquired Comsat Mobile Communications (USA) and Sait Communications, a leading maritime communications service provider which was renamed Marlink.

2007: Apax Partners acquired FTMSC and Telenor Satellite Services and formed Vizada.

2010: Vizada, through its subsidiary Marlink, received the Inmarsat 2010 partner award recognizing Vizada as a solutions innovator for the merchant shipping market.

2011: EADS acquired all assets of the Vizada Group for approximately US$1 billion for its Astrium Services business unit. The acquisition was concluded in December 2011.

2015: Airbus DS decided to sell its Satcom division.

Vizada Group 
Vizada Group operates offices and satellite gateways worldwide. It has three main subsidiaries: Vizada, which markets global mobile and fixed satellite communications, Vizada Networks, which specializes in fixed satellite and hybrid network solutions, and Marlink, which focuses on maritime satellite communication.

Vizada 
Vizada is an independent provider of global satellite-based mobility services. The company, which was formed by the merger of Telenor Satellite Services and France Telecom Mobile Satellite Communications, offers mobile and fixed connectivity services from multiple satellite network operators through a network of 400 service provider partners.

These services are packaged with Vizada Solutions, marketed as adding business value to basic connectivity, and delivered through Vizada's global teleport network – five state-of-the-art satellite facilities strategically positioned around the world.
Vizada works with a broad range of network providers in the industry, including: Inmarsat, Iridium, Thuraya, Eutelsat, Intelsat, Loral, SES World Skies, and SES Americom.

Vizada Networks 
Vizada Networks ( Networks), provides international and regional broadband fixed satellite services, international telephony and hybrid network solutions. Vizada Networks works with the major fixed satellite operators, such as Eutelsat, Intelsat, and SES World Skies.

Vizada Networks' main offices are located in Oslo and Holmestrand in Norway.

Marlink 
Marlink is a large maritime satellite communications provider equipping vessels with mobile-satellite services and VSAT services.

Products

Sea 
For more than 25 years, Vizada has provided maritime communication products based on Inmarsat and Iridium technologies. Vizada also developed its own satellite communication solution based on VSAT technology called Pharostar. Vizada's products provide broadband data and voice communications onboard seabound vessels.

Land 
Vizada provides land satellite communication products based on Inmarsat, Iridium and Thuraya technologies. Vizada also provides full broadband satellite solutions based on a customized VSAT network.

Air 
Vizada provides aero satellite communications products based on the Inmarsat Swift services. These products enable high speed and IP based communication both in cockpit and cabin for voice communication, internet browsing, fax and file sharing.

Solutions 
Vizada provides services around satellite communications such as data traffic management tools, secure communication tools, emailing services, data compression and encryption services, prepaid cards for satellite communications and fixed to satellite mobile communications.

Infrastructure

Land earth stations 

Vizada is operating five earth stations around the world that connect satellites to terrestrial networks.

Vizada also has an earth station in Japan through a partnership with KDDI. The earth station is located in Yamaguchi.

Point of presence 
Vizada's IP points of presence provide local access to the global broadband services. They are located in: 
 Amsterdam, the Netherlands
 Aussaguel, France
 Hong Kong, Hong Kong
 London, United Kingdom
 New York City, United States
 Oslo, Norway

Partnership

Telecoms Sans Frontières 

In 1998, Vizada entered into partnership with the Télécoms Sans Frontières (TSF). Vizada provides TSF with mobile satellites services and training for TSF personnel. TSF used Vizada's services on 14 separate occasions in 2009, and notably for the 2010 Haiti earthquake. In 2011, Vizada provided TSF with hardware, airtime for the voice calls and internet connections on the border between Tunisia and Libya.

See also 
 EADS
 EADS Astrium
 Iridium
 Thuraya
 VSAT

References

External links 
  Vizada official website
  Vizada Networks website
  Marlink website

Communications satellite operators